St. Luke Medical Center was a hospital located in the Sierra Madre region of Pasadena, California. Upon opening in 1933, the hospital was one of only 2 to serve the city of Pasadena in tandem with Huntington Hospital, until its closure in 2002. The hospital has since become a famous location for filming as it has appeared in various Music Videos, TV Shows, and Movies over the years.

History 
The hospital was originally built in 1933 to serve the Northeastern communities of Pasadena, Altadena, and Sierra Madre. The hospital was founded by the Sisters of St. Joseph of Orange to act as a medical facility for the local area in tandem with Huntington Hospital (opened in 1892). Multiple wings were constructed to branch out of the main building over the years. The hospital also included an original chapel on the Northeast corner of the property, the critical care wing was originally constructed in 1945, the original operation wings were completed in 1948. In 1976 another wing was added to increase the number of beds of use for patient care, by 1986, two new office buildings and a co-generation facility were also added. Despite the renovations; the hospital was negatively reviewed in several local news articles in 1986 criticizing its antiquated buildings and limited capacity of patients housed, prompting the building to get its final two structural additions in 1988 and 1990 respectively.

Decline
The hospital was purchased by Oronda Health Group in 1994 and saw the hospital receive funding to modernize the facility following Oronda's acquisition by Tenet Healthcare in 1996. However; within a few short years, Tenet would face criticism for its management of the hospital as patients and local residents began to note the declining service within St Luke. Huntington Hospital would undergo multiple renovations during the latter half of the 1990s; drawing in more patients from the area, and seeing more of St. Luke's medical staff transferring out of the aging facilities. By January 2002 Tenet Healthcare announced they would permanently close the facility by the end of the month due to St. Luke not reaching fiscal goals for the company. The hospital would close permanently on January 25, 2002.

Post-Closure
The year following the closure; Tenet sold the property to Caltech for use as a research facility due to its location at the base of Eaton Canyon. However; the university saw very little of use in the aging building and sold the property in 2007 to a Beverly Hills based real estate company. Due to the original Chapel's location on site, the city of Pasadena declared it a historical landmark; preventing the hospital from initial demolition plans in 2003. In the years following its sale, the property has been a very prominent film location due to its low cost and has featured in such movies as Kill Bill: Volume 1 and La La Land. In 2013 the hospital was briefly considered by the city of Pasadena for reuse again as an urgent care facility, however; the proposal was quickly vetoed as the location was deemed too outdated to meet updated standards.

Following the initial closure in 2002, and the sale from Caltech in 2007; the hospital was left with a large amount of remaining medical equipment and beds. At some point around 2011, Tenet covered most of their branding around the property and disposed of a large amount of the remaining patient records. The hospital would begin to fall victim to vandalism and scrapping at some point in the late 2010s as security up to that point had been very minimal. In 2020; the property's current owners boarded up all of the lower level windows, and installed security lights to repel vandals and the homeless population.

As a filming location
Notable works shot at St. Luke include the following:

Films
Equinox (1970)
Halloween II (1981)
Kill Bill: Volume 1 (2003)
Dead End (2003)
Starsky & Hutch (2004)
La La Land (2016)

Television programs

No Greater Love (1986)
MacGyver (2016–21)

Music videos
One Finger and a Fist - Drowning Pool (2013)
Run - Foo Fighters (2017)

See also
Linda Vista Community Hospital
LAC+USC Medical Center
Huntington Hospital
Lindy Boggs Medical Center

References

Defunct hospitals in California